Hendon Way is one of London's busiest roads. It connects Finchley Road to Watford Way. It passes through Hampstead and Hendon, and forms part of the A41 road. 
(London-Liverpool). It is a road that passes Staples Corner and meets the Watford Bypass.

References

Roads in London